The Pioneer Mountains are a mountain range in the U.S. state of Idaho, spanning Blaine, Butte and Custer counties. The range is bounded on the west by the Big Wood River, Trail Creek and Summit Creek, and the North Fork Big Lost River, on the north and east by the East Fork Big Lost River, Left Fork Cherry Creek, Cherry Creek, Dry Fork Creek, Saint Louis Canyon, and Champagne Creek, and on the south by the Snake River Plain.  The mountains are located within Sawtooth and Challis National Forests.

The Pioneer Mountains range was named for the pioneer settlers of the region; many of the individual mountains within the range also bear the name of these pioneers.

References

External links 

 Hyndman Peak Trip Report

Ranges of the Rocky Mountains
Mountain ranges of Idaho
Landforms of Blaine County, Idaho
Landforms of Butte County, Idaho
Landforms of Custer County, Idaho
Salmon-Challis National Forest
Sawtooth National Forest
Tourist attractions in Blaine County, Idaho
Tourist attractions in Butte County, Idaho
Tourist attractions in Custer County, Idaho